Thomas Gamage was a Welsh Anglican priest in the 17th century.

The son of Edward Gamage, Archdeacon of Llandaff from 1668 to 1686, he was born at Coychurch and educated at Jesus College, Oxford. He held livings at  Ubley, Penbryn, Llangyfelach and Llanedi.  Gamage was Archdeacon of Llandaff from 1670  until his death in 1705.

Notes

1705 deaths
17th-century Welsh Anglican priests
Archdeacons of Llandaff
Alumni of Jesus College, Oxford
People from Glamorgan